Callosamia is a genus of moths in the family Saturniidae first described by Packard in 1864.

Species
Callosamia angulifera (Walker, 1855)
Callosamia promethea (Drury, 1773)
Callosamia securifera (Maassen, 1873)

References

Saturniinae